Cymbidium bicolor, the two-colored cymbidium, is a species of orchid found in South China to Tropical Asia.

 Subspecies
 Cymbidium bicolor subsp. bicolor (S. India, Sri Lanka) Pseudobulb epiphyte
 Cymbidium bicolor subsp. obtusum (Himalaya to S. China and Indo-China). Pseudobulb epiphyte
 Cymbidium bicolor subsp. pubescens (W. & C. Malaysia)

References

External links 
 
 

bicolor
Orchids of Bangladesh
Orchids of Cambodia
Orchids of China
Orchids of India
Orchids of Laos
Orchids of Malaysia
Orchids of Myanmar
Orchids of Sri Lanka
Orchids of Thailand
Orchids of Vietnam
Orchids of Bhutan
Plants described in 1833